Everetts Historic District is a national historic district located at Everetts, Martin County, North Carolina.  The district encompasses 84 contributing buildings, 3 contributing sites, and 1 contributing structure in the town of Everetts.  They include notable examples of Queen Anne, Colonial Revival, Romanesque, and Bungalow / American Craftsman architecture in buildings dated from the 1870s through the 1950s.  Most of the district's extant historic buildings date from the early 1900s and 1910s. Located in the district is the separately listed Everetts Christian Church. Other notable buildings include the Simon Peter and Minerva Jane Everett House (1870s), Peel House (c. 1955), Barnhill's Hardware and Grocery Store (1907), the J. S. Peel Commercial Building (1909), Taylor-Peel House (c. 1918), and the Everetts Community Building (1952).

It was listed on the National Register of Historic Places in 2014.

References

Historic districts on the National Register of Historic Places in North Carolina
Colonial Revival architecture in North Carolina
Romanesque Revival architecture in North Carolina
Queen Anne architecture in North Carolina
Buildings and structures in Martin County, North Carolina
National Register of Historic Places in Martin County, North Carolina